
Łódź East County is a unit of territorial administration and local government (powiat) in Łódź Voivodeship, central Poland. It came into being on January 1, 1999, as a result of the Polish local government reforms passed in 1998. Its administrative seat is the city of Łódź, although the city is not part of the county (it constitutes a separate city county).

As of 2006 its total population is 64,574, out of which the population of Koluszki is 13,407, that of Tuszyn is 7,178, that of Rzgów is 3,338, and the rural population is 40,651.

Until 2002 the county also included the areas which now form Brzeziny County.

Neighbouring counties
Apart from the city of Łódź, Łódź East County is also bordered by Zgierz County to the north, Brzeziny County to the north-east, Tomaszów Mazowiecki County to the south-east, Piotrków County to the south and Pabianice County to the west.

Administrative division
The county is subdivided into six gminas (three urban-rural and three rural). These are listed in the following table, in descending order of population.

References
Polish official population figures 2006

 
Land counties of Łódź Voivodeship